The Ticket-of-Leave Man is a 1918 British silent crime film directed by Bert Haldane and starring Daphne Glenne, George Foley and Aubrey Fitzmaurice. It is an adaptation of the 1863 melodrama The Ticket-of-Leave Man by Tom Taylor.

Cast
 Daphne Glenne as May Edwards  
 George Foley as Bob Brierley  
 Aubrey Fitzmaurice as Hawkshaw  
 Wilfred Benson as James Tiger Dalton  
 Rolf Leslie as Melter Moss 
 Rachel de Solla as Mrs. Willoughby 
 George Harrington as Eliza

References

Bibliography
 Goble, Alan. The Complete Index to Literary Sources in Film. Walter de Gruyter, 1999.

External links

1918 films
1910s historical films
British silent feature films
British historical films
Films set in the 19th century
Films directed by Bert Haldane
British black-and-white films
British crime films
1918 crime films
1910s English-language films
1910s British films